Pearl Conklin (April 25, 1879 – April 13, 1961) was an American composer. Her work was part of the music event in the art competition at the 1932 Summer Olympics.

References

1879 births
1961 deaths
American women composers
Olympic competitors in art competitions
People from Winona, Mississippi